MBH and variant capitalisations can refer to:

Movimiento de Bases Hayistas (Spanish), see Hayist Bases Movement
A unit of power - a thousand BTUs per hour
"mbH" see Gesellschaft mit beschränkter Haftung
Mbh, abbreviation for Mahabharata used in citations
MBH Architects
Maryborough Airport (Queensland), IATA airport code "MBH"